Shoftim, Shof'tim, or Shofetim (שופטים), Hebrew for “judges,” may mean:

The plural of Shofet, judge
Sefer Shoftim (ספר שופטים), the Hebrew name for the Book of Judges
Shofetim (parsha) (פרשה שופטים), the 48th weekly parshah or portion in the annual Jewish cycle of Torah reading and the fifth in the book of Deuteronomy  
The 14th book of the Mishneh Torah, the code of Jewish law by Maimonides